Ambient Weather is an Arizona based weather station and software manufacturer that specializes in customized solutions and products for the home and office, industry, schools, resorts, government and the media.

The company's exceptional growth has put them on the Inc. Magazine's Top 500/5000 list Honor Roll  of fastest growing private companies for five consecutive years (2004–2008), and they were named one of the 500 largest Internet Retailers ranked by annual sales in the United States according to Internet Retailer magazine in 2007.

Their flagship product Virtual Weather Station is a software package for connecting personal computers to weather stations and the Internet, which displays, plots and stores data for monitoring and analysis. They launched a weather station cloud service in 2017. AmbientWeather.net provides live data monitoring, forecasts and weather maps, graphs and historical data, email and text alerts, and API, IFTTT, Amazon Alexa and Google Home integration.

In 2019, Ambient Weather was acquired by Nielsen-Kellerman, a manufacturer of weather stations, ballistics and weather instruments, and sports performance products.

References 

Online retailers of the United States
Meteorological companies
Educational software for Windows
Science software for Windows
Companies based in Phoenix, Arizona